Qurt Tappeh (also Romanized as Qūrt Tappeh; also known as Ghoort Tappeh) is a village in Arshaq-e Gharbi Rural District of Moradlu District, Meshgin Shahr County, Ardabil province, Iran. At the 2006 census, its population was 961 in 201 households. The following census in 2011 counted 803 people in 181 households. The latest census in 2016 showed a population of 594 people in 163 households; it was the largest village in its rural district.

References 

Meshgin Shahr County

Towns and villages in Meshgin Shahr County

Populated places in Ardabil Province

Populated places in Meshgin Shahr County